Alex Bent  (born January 31, 1993) is an American musician best known as the drummer for heavy metal bands Trivium, Arkaik and Dragonlord. Bent is a former drummer for Battlecross and Brain Drill.

Bent has also toured with Decrepit Birth and Testament.

Early life

Bent was born January 31, 1993, in Oakland, California. When Bent turned 11 years of age, he asked his father to assemble his old drum kit.  After teaching himself how to perform percussion for just over one year, he competed in drum competitions and auditioned for various musical ensembles.

When Bent turned 15, he performed with Marching Band, Concert Band, Jazz Band, Modesto Junior College Jazz Band in addition to other local musical groups.  Within the next 3 years, he participated in the Guitar Center Drum Off making it to Regional Finals.

Musical career

Early career

In 2011, Bent joined Arkaik, touring with Decrepit Birth and Hatriot in 2012 and becoming a settled member of Brain Drill and Dragonlord in 2015.

Battlecross and Testament

In April 2015, American blue collar metal band Battlecross employed Bent for their "Summer of Doom Tour" with Crowbar and Lord Dying. Later that year, Bent filled in for Gene Hoglan of Testament.

Trivium

At the recommendation of producer Mark Lewis, Trivium had Bent audition for the role as their new drummer, replacing former drummer Paul Wandtke. In January 2017, Trivium confirmed Bent as their drummer for their February 2017 European tour with Sikth and Shvpes.

Discography

Trivium
 The Sin and the Sentence (2017)
 What the Dead Men Say (2020)
 In the Court of the Dragon (2021)

Brain Drill
 Boundless Obscenity (2016)

Dragonlord
 Dominion (2018)

Battlecross
 Rise to Power (2015)

Arkaik
 Metamorphignition (2012)

References

1993 births
Living people
American heavy metal drummers
American male drummers
People from Oakland, California
21st-century American drummers
21st-century American male musicians